Joseph Henry Orme (8 November 1884 – June 1935) was an English professional footballer who played as a goalkeeper in the Football League for Nottingham Forest.

Personal life 
Orme served as a private in the Football Battalion of the Middlesex Regiment during the First World War.

Career statistics

References

1884 births
1935 deaths
Footballers from Derbyshire
English footballers
English Football League players
Association football goalkeepers
Chesterfield F.C. players
Watford F.C. players
British Army personnel of World War I
Middlesex Regiment soldiers
Millwall F.C. players
Notts County F.C. wartime guest players
Nottingham Forest F.C. players
Heanor Town F.C. players
Shirebrook Miners Welfare F.C. players
Midland Football League players
Southern Football League players
Date of death unknown
Military personnel from Derbyshire